Fever to Tell is the debut studio album by American indie rock band Yeah Yeah Yeahs, released on April 29, 2003, by Interscope Records. It was produced by David Andrew Sitek and mixed by Alan Moulder. Four singles were issued, the first being "Date with the Night" followed by "Pin", "Maps" and "Y Control".

Fever to Tell was both a critical and commercial success; it has sold one million copies worldwide.

Recording and production
By 2002, Yeah Yeah Yeahs had achieved a respected reputation for their live performances and critical acclaim for their debut EP, leading to several overtures from major record labels. The band wanted to finance their debut album themselves and chose to record at the low-budget Headgear Studio in Brooklyn. "It was really important for us to do it on our turf, on our terms", lead singer Karen O later told Spin. "We were all living together, and all the money we used to fund it came out of our pocket."

Fever to Tell was produced by Yeah Yeah Yeahs with David Andrew Sitek, a multi-instrumentalist and producer from the band TV on the Radio. Karen O and Yeah Yeah Yeahs guitarist Nick Zinner first met Sitek while working together at a Brooklyn clothing store, and he went on to drive and manage them for their first concert tour. In 2002, the band asked Sitek to produce their debut album. She recalled the decision in an interview with Lizzy Goodman for her 2017 book Meet Me in the Bathroom. "I remember him giving me a few burned CDs of stuff that he had worked on", Karen O said. "I guess he was just a buddy, and we felt immediately like we were family with him. And we didn’t know anyone else. That was probably one of the biggest reasons we worked with him, because we didn’t know anyone else. Then, of course, he ended up being really fucking masterful."

Once the recording was finished, the album was mixed in London by Zinner and sound engineer Alan Moulder.

Musical style
According to Paste, Fever to Tell was representative of the early-2000s' garage rock revival, while Dan Epstein from Rolling Stone called the record an "NYC art-punk landmark". Its music was also described as "ecstatic dance punk", by Alex Denney of The Guardian. Journalist Jon Pareles of The New York Times said that the band "are closer to Siouxsie and the Banshees (but with a grin) and Led Zeppelin (but with estrogen) than to the blues". The slow closing track "Modern Romance" was compared to a Velvet Underground drone. Music historian Nick Kent compared Karen O's singing style to Lydia Lunch and PJ Harvey. Kent also described the record as musically "Siouxsie Sioux jamming with Led Zeppelin". Journalist Alexis Petridis remarked that "Y Control" was based on a riff from art-rockers Big Black, then transformed into spacey new-wave pop.

Marketing and sales
Fever to Tell was released on May 3, 2003, by Interscope Records. It debuted at number 67 on the Billboard 200 in the week of May 17. To promote the album, "Date with the Night" and "Pin" were released as the first two singles. Interscope wanted to release "Maps" earlier but the band's resistance delayed it until February 2004, when the album had sold only 124,000 copies. The single became a hit on MTV and rock radio, charting at number nine on Billboards Hot Modern Rock Tracks, and its success helped triple sales of the album.

In March 2009, the album reached sales of more than one million copies worldwide. As of March 2013, Fever to Tell had sold 640,000 copies in United States.

Critical reception

Fever to Tell was met with widespread critical acclaim. At Metacritic, which assigns a normalized rating out of 100 to reviews from mainstream publications, the album received an average score of 85, based on 27 reviews. In a four star review, Andrew Perry of Rolling Stone wrote: "There are half a dozen songs under three minutes on Fever to Tell, and they sound absolutely complete". Andrew Perry from The Daily Telegraph called it an "exhilarating dose of lo-fi garage-rock". In The Village Voice, Robert Christgau observed "a striking sound" that is "both big and punk, never a natural combo", and highlighted by Zinner's "dangerous riffs". He had reservations about the subject matter, however; while noting "two human-scale songs toward the end", Christgau said "to care about this band you have to find Karen O's fuck-me persona provocative if not seductive, and since I've never been one for the sex-is-combat thing, I find it silly or obnoxious depending on who's taking it seriously."

Fever to Tell was nominated for a Grammy Award for Best Alternative Music Album and was certified gold in both the United States and the United Kingdom. The video for "Maps" received nominations for Best Art Direction, Best Cinematography, Best Editing, and the MTV2 Award at the 2004 MTV Video Music Awards. The New York Times chose Fever to Tell as the best album of 2003.

In June 2005, the album was ranked number 89 on Spin magazine's list of the 100 Greatest Albums, 1985–2005. Featuring in the 2010 book 1001 Albums You Must Hear Before You Die, Fever to Tell was hailed as "the coolest and cleverest record of 2003". In 2009, the album was named by NME, Pitchfork, and Rolling Stone the fifth, 24th, and 28th best album of the 2000s decade, respectively. In 2019, the album was ranked 38th on The Guardians 100 Best Albums of the 21st Century list. In 2020, it was ranked number 377 on Rolling Stone's Top 500 Albums of All-Time.

Track listing

2017 limited deluxe edition box setNotes'''
 Track 11 includes the hidden track "Poor Song" at the 4:25 mark, after "Modern Romance" ends at 3:15. "Poor Song" appears as a separate track on the 2017 digital deluxe remastered edition.

Personnel
Credits adapted from the liner notes of Fever to Tell''.

Yeah Yeah Yeahs
 Brian Chase – drums
 Karen O – vocals
 Nick Zinner – guitars, drum machine

Technical
 David Andrew Sitek – production ; mixing 
 Yeah Yeah Yeahs – production
 Paul Mahajan – engineering
 Alan Moulder – mixing 
 Nick Zinner – mixing 
 Rick Levy – mixing assistance
 Chris Coady – post-production 
 Howie Weinberg – mastering
 Roger Lian – track editing
 Cody Critcheloe – artwork

Charts

Certifications

Notes

References

2003 debut albums
Albums produced by Dave Sitek
Interscope Records albums
Yeah Yeah Yeahs albums